A referendum on health insurance was held in Liechtenstein on 31 January 1999. The proposal was rejected by 66% of voters.

Results

References

Liechtenstein
Health
Referendums in Liechtenstein
Health in Liechtenstein
Liechtenstein